This is a list of events in South African sport in 1995.

Football (Rugby Union)
 25 May - 24 June - South Africa hosts and wins the Third Rugby World Cup

Football (Soccer)

April
 26 April - South Africa (Bafana Bafana) beats Lesotho 3-1 at the Setsoto Stadium, Maseru, Lesotho in a friendly match

May
 13 May - Bafana Bafana draws with Argentina 1-1 at the Ellis Park Stadium, Johannesburg in the Nelson Mandela Challenge

September
 30 September - Bafana Bafana beats Mozambique 3-2 at Soccer City, Johannesburg, in a friendly match

November
 22 November - Bafana Bafana draws with Zambia 2-2 at Loftus Versfeld Stadium, Pretoria, in the Simba Cup
 24 November - Bafana Bafana beats Egypt 2-0 at Independence Stadium, Mmabatho, in the Simba Cup
 26 November - Bafana Bafana beats Zimbabwe 2-0 at Soccer City, Johannesburg, in the Simba Cup

December
 15 December - Bafana Bafana draws with the Germany 0-0 at Athletics Stadium, Johannesburg, in a friendly match

See also
1994 in South African sport 
1995 in South Africa
1996 in South African sport
List of years in South African sport

 
South Africa